You Don't Know Women is a television drama series from South Korea starring Kim Ji-ho, Go Se-won and Im Ho. The morning soap opera aired on SBS on Mondays to Fridays at 8:40 a.m. from August 2 to December 31, 2010 for 109 episodes.

Cast
Lee family
 Kim Ji-ho as Lee Min-jung
 Lee Kyung-jin as Han Pyung-ja
 Goo Seung-hyun as Lee Sa-rang (Min-jung's son)

Park family
 Go Se-won as Park Moo-hyuk
 Gi Ju-bong as President Park

Kang family
 Im Ho as Kang Sung-chan
 Chae Min-seo Oh Yoo-ran
 Moon Ji-in as Oh Kyung-ran
 Im Ye-jin as Jang Geum-sook
 Lee Jung-gil as Kang Gyo-jang

Extended cast
 Jung Kyung-soon as Go Mi-ae
 Park Jung-woo as Ma Kang-soo
 Baek Seung-hyeon as Kim Jin-woo
 Park Sun-joon as Jin Sung-mo
 Park Young-jin as Joo Ki-ja
 Ji Yoo as Jang Eun-young
 Son Jung-min
 Kim Ga-eun

See also
 List of South Korean television series

References

External links
 You Don't Know Women official SBS website 
 

2010 South Korean television series debuts
2010 South Korean television series endings
Korean-language television shows
Seoul Broadcasting System television dramas
South Korean romance television series